Pigres of Paionia, with his brother Mantyas and his sister, came to Sardes, where the Persian king Darius I was at the time, hoping that by the favour of Darius he and his brother might be established as tyrants over the Paeonians. Darius, however, was so pleased with the exhibition of industry and dexterity which he saw in their sister that he sent orders to Megabazus to transport Paeonians into Asia.

References

 Herodotus 5.12
 

Paeonian people
Skudra